The grey-sided flowerpecker (Dicaeum celebicum) is a species of bird in the family Dicaeidae. It is endemic to Indonesia. Its natural habitats are subtropical or tropical moist lowland forest and subtropical or tropical moist montane forest.

Taxonomy and systematics 
The grey-sided flowerpecker has five subspecies recognized:

D. c. talautense - Meyer, AB & Wiglesworth, 1895: Endemic to Talaud Islands
D. c. sanghirense - Salvadori, 1876: Endemic to Sangihe and Siau Island
D. c. celebicum - Müller, S, 1843: Endemic to Sulawesi, Manadotua, Bangka, Lembeh, Togian, Muna and Butung
D. c. sulaense - Sharpe, 1884: Endemic to Sula Islands and Banggai Islands
Wakatobi flowerpecker (D. c. kuehni) - Hartert, 1903: Considered by some authorities as a separate species. Found in the Wakatobi archipelago (south-east of Sulawesi)

Gallery

References

Dicaeum
Endemic birds of Sulawesi
Articles containing video clips
Birds described in 1843
Taxonomy articles created by Polbot